Luis Enrique Mendoza is a Colombian former professional boxer who competed between 1985 and 1998.

Boxing career

Amateur career
Mendoza participated in the 1983 Pan American Games, he would lose in the first round to Dominican boxer Laureano Ramírez.

Professional career
Mendoza turned professional in 1985 & amassed a record of 26-2-2 before he challenged and beat compatriot Rubén Darío Palacio, to win the vacant WBA super bantamweight world title. Mendoza defended the title four times including against French boxer Fabrice Benichou. He would eventually lose the title to Mexico's Raúl Pérez.

Professional boxing record

See also
List of world super-bantamweight boxing champions

References

External links

 

|-

Year of birth missing (living people)
Date of birth missing (living people)
Living people
Colombian male boxers
People from Sucre Department
Boxers at the 1983 Pan American Games
Bantamweight boxers
Featherweight boxers
Super-featherweight boxers
World super-bantamweight boxing champions
World Boxing Association champions